Paul Runge may refer to:

Paul Runge (umpire) (born 1941), Canadian-born American baseball umpire
Paul Runge (ice hockey) (1908–1972), Canadian ice hockey player
Paul Runge (infielder) (born 1958), American baseball player
Paul Runge (serial killer) (born 1970), American serial killer